Australia competed at the 1960 Winter Olympics in Squaw Valley, United States. This was the first and last time Australia competed in ice hockey and Nordic combined. While ice hockey gave Australia its only top ten finish in this games, the team lost all of their matches, conceding double-digit goals. Australia also competed in alpine skiing, cross-country skiing, and figure skating, where Mervyn Bower and Jacqueline Mason came twelfth in the pairs event.

Alpine skiing

Men

Women

Cross-country skiing

Men

Figure skating

Ice hockey

Team roster

First round
Group C

Consolation round

Nordic combined

Speed skating

See also
Australia at the Winter Olympics

External links
Australia NOC
Olympic Winter Institute of Australia

References 
Specific

General
"Australians at the Olympics: A definitive history" by Gary Lester  (suspected errata listed in Errata/0949853054)
"2002 Australian Winter Olympic Team Guide" PDF file
"The Compendium: Official Australian Olympic Statistics 1896-2002" Australian Olympic Committee  (Inconsistencies in sources mentioned in Wikibooks:Errata/0702234257)
"Winter Olympic Representatives 1924 - 2002" Ice Skating Australia

Nations at the 1960 Winter Olympics
1960 Winter Olympics
Winter sports in Australia
1960 in Australian sport